The C platform, or C-body, name has been used twice by General Motors for its full-size car platform. 
 
 1925-1984 GM C platform (RWD)
 1985-1996 GM C platform (FWD)

C